Victoria is a 2013 Norwegian drama film directed by Torun Lian, starring Jakob Oftebro, Iben Akerlie and Bill Skarsgård. It tells the story of the love between the daughter of a landowner and the son of a local miller. The film is based on the novel Victoria by Knut Hamsun. It was released in Norway on 1 March 2013. Fridtjov Såheim received the Amanda Award for Best Actor in a Supporting Role.

Cast
 Iben Akerlie as Victoria
 Jakob Oftebro as Johannes
 Bill Skarsgård as Otto
 Fridtjov Såheim as Victoria's father

References

External links 
 

2013 drama films
2013 films
Films based on Norwegian novels
Films based on romance novels
Films based on works by Knut Hamsun
Films set in Norway
Norwegian drama films
2010s Norwegian-language films